Behold, We Live is a 1932 play by the British writer John Van Druten. It had an original West End run of 158 performances at St James's Theatre in London between 18 August and 31 December 1932. It was produced by Gilbert Miller. The cast included Gerald du Maurier, Gertrude Lawrence, May Whitty, Ronald Ward and Everley Gregg.

Adaptation
In 1933 it was turned into a Hollywood film If I Were Free starring Irene Dunne, Clive Brook, Nils Asther.

References

Bibliography
 Goble, Alan. The Complete Index to Literary Sources in Film. Walter de Gruyter, 1999.
 Wearing, J.P. The London Stage 1930-1939: A Calendar of Productions, Performers, and Personnel.  Rowman & Littlefield, 2014.

1932 plays
Plays by John Van Druten
British plays adapted into films
West End plays